is a former Japanese football player and manager. He is the current manager of Sagan Tosu. His brother Koichi Kawai is also a footballer.

Playing career
Kawai was born in Uwajima on June 7, 1981. After graduating from Momoyama Gakuin University, he joined Japan Football League club Ehime FC based in his local in 2004. His brother Koichi Kawai was also playing for this club from 2001. He played many matches in first season. However he could not play at all in the match in 2005. Although the club was promoted to J2 League from 2006, he could not play many matches and retired end of 2006 season.

Coaching career
After the retirement, Kawai started coaching career at Ehime Women's College based in his local Uwajima in 2008. He served as manager until 2017. In 2012, he also signed with Nadeshiko League club Ehime FC Ladies. He served as a coach under manager Kenichi Ego who is teammate as player in 2006. In 2015, Kawai became a manager as Ego successor. He managed the club until 2017. In 2018, he signed with J2 League club Ehime FC and became a manager for youth team. In May 2018, top team manager Shuichi Mase was sacked when the club was at the 20th place of 22 clubs. Kawai became a manager for top team as Mase successor. Kawai rose the club and finished at the 18th place in 2018 season.

Club statistics

Managerial statistics
Update; April 17, 2022

References

External links

1981 births
Living people
Momoyama Gakuin University alumni
People from Uwajima, Ehime
Association football people from Ehime Prefecture
Japanese footballers
J2 League players
Japan Football League players
Ehime FC players
Japanese football managers
J1 League managers
J2 League managers
Ehime FC managers
Sagan Tosu managers
Association football forwards